McAllister Creek is a stream in Thurston County in the U.S. state of Washington. It is a tributary to Puget Sound.

McAllister Creek was named after James McAllister, a pioneer who arrived in the 1840s. The creek is also known as Medicine Creek or šxʷnanəm, to the Puyallup people.

References

Rivers of Thurston County, Washington
Rivers of Washington (state)

http://puyallup-tribe.com/ourtribe/